Abdoulaye Sileye Gaye (born 13 September 1991) is a Mauritanian footballer playing with FK Liepāja.

Career
He was playing with ASAC Concorde before joining FK Renova in the Macedonian First Football League in the season 2010–11. After his spell in Macedonia, he returned to his homeland and continued playing with ASAC Concorde.

He has been a regular member of the Mauritania national football team since 2012.

International goals
Scores and results list Mauritania's goal tally first.

Honours
ASAC Concorde
Ligue 1 Mauritania: 2008
Mauritanian Cup: 2009

ACS Ksar
Mauritanian Cup: 2014, 2015

Tevragh-Zeina
Ligue 1 Mauritania: 2016
Mauritanian Cup: 2016

References

1991 births
Living people
Mauritanian footballers
Mauritania international footballers
Association football midfielders
People from Nouakchott
FK Renova players
Expatriate footballers in North Macedonia
FK Liepāja players
Expatriate footballers in Latvia
FC Tevragh-Zeina players
Macedonian First Football League players
Mauritanian expatriate sportspeople in Latvia
2019 Africa Cup of Nations players
Mauritania A' international footballers
2018 African Nations Championship players
Mauritanian expatriate sportspeople in North Macedonia
Mauritanian expatriate footballers